Blue Planet may refer to:

Natural sciences
 Earth, has been referred to as the Blue Planet due to the abundant water on its surface and/or the atmospheric hue
 The Blue Planet, a BBC documentary series narrated by David Attenborough
 Blue Planet II, a sequel to the documentary
 Blue Planet (film), a 1990 documentary film directed by Ben Burtt
 Blue Planet (aquarium), a public aquarium in Copenhagen, Denmark
 Blue Planet Aquarium, a public aquarium in Cheshire, England

Music
 Blue Planet (Donna Lewis album), the second studio album from singer Donna Lewis
 "Blue Planet" (Alice Nine song), a 2006 single by Japanese rock band Alice Nine
 Blue Planet (Donna Lewis song), a song from the  Blue Planet
 Planeta Azul, translated Blue Planet, the debut album by Spanish singer Ruth Lorenzo
 Planeta Azul (song), a song from the eponymous 2014 album Planeta Azul
 "Der blaue Planet" (The Blue Planet), a 1981 German song

Other uses
 Blue Planet (role-playing game), a science-fiction game

See also 
 
 
 Blue dwarf (disambiguation)
 Blue giant (disambiguation)
 Blue star (disambiguation)
 Blue world (disambiguation)